Quitmaniceras is a genus of small, compressed, fairly evolute ammonites from the lower Turonian of Grant County, New Mexico and Trans-Pecos Texas, included in the subfamily Acanthoceratinae. The shell has a carinate venter in juveniles and one that is arched in adults, usually with a raised siphonal line,(siphonal referring to the marginal siphuncle). Ribs are very weak to moderately strong, flexious, typically sloping forward toward the rim, bending further forward at the outer shoulder.

Distribution 
Fossils of Quitmaniceras have been found in Colombia (Loma Gorda Formation, Aipe, Huila), Mexico and the United States (Arizona and Texas).

References

Bibliography

Further reading 
 W.A. Cobban, S.C. Hook & W.J.Kennedy, 1989.  Upper Cretaceous rocks and ammonite faunas of southwestern New Mexico,  Memoir 45, New Mexico Bureau of Mines & Mineral Resources

Acanthoceratidae
Ammonitida genera
Cretaceous ammonites
Ammonites of North America
Cretaceous Mexico
Cretaceous United States
Ammonites of South America
Cretaceous Colombia